TharnType: The Series is 2019 Thai BL television series starring Suppasit Jongcheveevat (Mew) and Kanawut Traipipattanapong (Gulf). It is an adaptation of popular web novel TharnType Story เกลียดนักมาเป็นที่รักกันซะดีๆ ( TharnType's Story: Hate You, Love You More) by MAME (Orawan Vichayawannakul). The story tells about prejudiced university boy and a homosexual room mate who are always on constant tension but gradually open up to each other, developing their hate into affection. The series, directed by Bundit Sintanaparadee (Tee) and produced by Me Mind Y, premiered in Thailand and aired on One 31 from October 7, 2019 to January 6, 2020 with repeats on LINE TV. A special episode titled TharnType Special, Our Final Love was screened on January 19, 2020 at Siam Pavalai Royal Grand Theatre.

Synopsis 
Type Thiwat is a handsome freshman with a passion for football and spicy food. Although he’s a friendly boy, he hates gay people because, in his childhood, he was molested by a male worker at his family’s resort. His life turns upside down when the new academic year of college brings along a charismatic roommate, Tharn Kirigun. Tharn is a gorgeous, compassionate music major, who is also openly gay. When Type learns this, he is determined to make Tharn leave the dorm, as he refuses to live with a gay person. Tharn is equally determined not to give into Type's homophobic demands and tantrums. The tension between the two increases as they explore romantic, and eventually sexual, dimensions of their relationship.

Cast and characters 
Below are the cast of the series:

Main 
 Suppasit Jongcheveevat (Mew) as Tharn Thara Kirigun
 Kanawut Traipipattanapong (Gulf) as Type Thiwat Phawattakun

Supporting 
 Suttinut Uengtrakul (Mild) as Techno
 Kittipat Kaewcharoen (Kaownah) as Lhong
 Natthad Kunakornkiat (Hiter) as Tum
 Parinya Angsanan (Kokliang) as Tar
 Napat Sinnakuan (Boat) as Champ
 Thanayut Thakoonauttaya (Tong) as Thorn
 Tanawin Duangnate (Mawin) as Khlui
 Kantheephop Sirorattanaphanit (Run) as Seo
 Wasin Panunaporn (Kenji) as Technic
 Pongkorn Wongkrittiyarat (Kaprao) as Khom
 Pattarabut Kiennukul (AA) as San
 Siwapohn Langkapin (Eye) as Puifai

Guest role 
 Suppapong Udomkaewkanjana (Saint) as Pete
 Phiravich Attachitsataporn (Mean) as Tin
 Siwat Jumlongkul (Mark) as Kengkla

Original Media 
The novel TharnType Story เกลียดนักมาเป็นที่รักกันซะดีๆ
was first released online on December 2, 2014 via Dek-D.com's platform for writers. Even though the story is a spinoff of MAME's previous novel My Accidental Love is You, the event of TharnType Story takes place three years prior to the latter. The novel was published as a physical copy in 2016, compiling 62 chapters into two books. A sequel story consists of 22 chapters about Tharn and Type's life as a couple in their seventh year was published as one physical book following the first two books. As of 2020, TharnType Story has 216% ratings on its Dek-D official page with over 3.8 million total views.

Soundtracks

Awards

Notes

References

External links
 TharnType on LINE TV
 

Thai boys' love television series
Thai comedy television series
2010s LGBT-related comedy television series
2020s LGBT-related comedy television series
2019 Thai television series debuts
2020 Thai television series endings
Fictional LGBT couples